Paramysis baeri is a species of mysid crustacean from the genus Paramysis, named in honour of the prominent biologist Karl Ernst von Baer. For over a century, it was thought to be distributed throughout the whole Ponto-Caspian basin, but recently the range was reconsidered after the rediscovery and re-establishment of the closely related species Paramysis bakuensis. Since the taxonomical status of P. baeri has been reconsidered, the distribution and ecology of the species remains poorly known. Paramysis baeri can be distinguished from P. bakuensis and other species of the subgenus Paramysis s. str. by the rather broad, almost quadrangular exopod of maxilla 2, the strongly serrated paradactylar claw-setae of pereiopod 6, and other features.

References

Mysida
Crustaceans described in 1882
Freshwater crustaceans of Asia
Fauna of the Caspian Sea